Manlius Township, Illinois may refer to one of the following townships:

 Manlius Township, Bureau County, Illinois
 Manlius Township, LaSalle County, Illinois

See also

Manlius Township (disambiguation)

Illinois township disambiguation pages